Day Off may refer to: 

 Day Off (film), French film
 Day Off (TV program), former Philippine TV series
 Days Off (EP)
 A Day Off, a 1968 South Korean drama film
 Day Off (book) Giampiero (flower) Foppapedretti

See also
 Paid time off